NGC 732 is a lenticular galaxy located 250 million light-years away in the constellation Andromeda. It was discovered by astronomer Édouard Stephan on December 5, 1883 and is a member of Abell 262.

2017fpt
On July 20, 2017 a type Ia supernova designated as 2017fpt was discovered in NGC 732.

See also
 List of NGC objects (1–1000)

References

External links
 
 

732
007270
Andromeda (constellation)
Astronomical objects discovered in 1883
Lenticular galaxies
Abell 262
01406
Discoveries by Édouard Stephan